Club San Albano is an Argentine sports club from the Burzaco district of Greater Buenos Aires. San Albano is mostly known for its rugby union team, which currently plays in Primera División A, the second division of the Unión de Rugby de Buenos Aires league system. The field hockey team competes at tournaments organized by the Buenos Aires Hockey Association.

Other sports practised at San Albano are cricket and tennis.

History
San Albano was founded on May 22, 1927, by alumni of the Quilmes Grammar School and the later Saint Alban's College. Originally born as a cricket club with the name of "Old Philomathian Club" (the name refers to the inscription of Philomathes Polymathes in the school badge), the institution added football and tennis sections in the 1930s.

Old Philomathian registered with Argentine Rugby Union in 1949 and started playing in 1950. By 1960 the club promoted to first division, although it went straight back down a year later. For the first years of its existence, Old Philomathian achieved more success in the sevens version of the game, winning the Argentine Rugby Union tournament in 1958. Field hockey started being played at the club in 1967, taking part in men's and women's tournaments.

The institution would be later forced to change its name in the mid-seventies from the former Old Philomathian Club to "Asociación de Ex-Alumnos del Colegio San Albano" due to administrative regulations. From humble beginnings, San Albano reached the first division in 2002 and has remained there since then.

Cricket Ground

Honours

Cricket
Primera División (10): 
 1992–93, 1995–96, 1998–99, 1999–00, 2004–05, 2006–07, 2008–09, 2011–12, 2015–16, 2017–18

References

External links
 
 St. Alban's College website

s
s
s
s
s
s